Voluta is a genus of medium to large sea snails, marine gastropod molluscs in the family Volutidae, the volutes.

Species
Species in the genus Voluta include:
 Voluta ambigua (Solander in Brander, 1766)
 Voluta demarcoi Olsson, 1965
 Voluta ebraea Linnaeus, 1758
 Voluta ernesti (Petuch, 1990)
 Voluta garciai (Petuch, 1981)
 Voluta harasewychi (Petuch, 1987)
 Voluta hilli (Petuch, 1987)
 Voluta kotorai (Petuch, 1981)
 Voluta morrisoni (Petuch, 1980)
 Voluta musica Linnaeus, 1758
 Voluta polypleura Crosse, 1876
 Voluta retemirabilis (Petuch, 1981)
 Voluta sunderlandi (Petuch, 1987)
 Voluta virescens Lightfoot, 1786
Taxon inquirendum
 Voluta cumingii Broderip, 1832
 Nomen dubium
 † Voluta corrugata Hutton, 1873
Subgenera brought into synonymy
 Voluta (Callipara): synonym of Callipara Gray, 1847
 Voluta (Fulgoraria) Schumacher, 1817: synonym of Fulgoraria Schumacher, 1817
 Voluta (Psephaea) Crosse, 1871: synonym of Fulgoraria (Psephaea) Crosse, 1871
Species brought into synonymy
 Voluta coniformis Cox, 1871: synonym of Volutoconus coniformis (Cox, 1871)
 Voluta cymbiola Gmelin, 1791: synonym of Cymbiola (Cymbiola) cymbiola (Gmelin, 1791)
 Voluta dohrni G.B. Sowerby III, 1903: synonym of Scaphella dohrni (G.B. Sowerby III, 1903)
 Voluta heteroclita Montagu, 1808: synonym of Blauneria heteroclita (Montagu, 1808)
 Voluta hiatula Gmelin, 1791: synonym of Agaronia hiatula (Gmelin, 1791)
 Voluta kreuslerae Angas, 1865: synonym of Notovoluta kreuslerae (Angas, 1865)
 Voluta lacertina Petuch, 1990: synonym of Voluta virescens virescens Lightfoot, 1786
 Voluta lapponica Linnaeus, 1767: synonym of Harpulina lapponica (Linnaeus, 1767)
 Voluta mammilla G.B. Sowerby I, 1844: synonym of Livonia mammilla (G.B. Sowerby I, 1844)
 Voluta nivosa Lamarck, 1804: synonym of Cymbiola nivosa (Lamarck, 1804)
 Voluta rhinoceros Gmelin, 1791: synonym of Vasum rhinoceros (Gmelin, 1791)

References

 Bail, P & Poppe, G. T. 2001. A conchological iconography: a taxonomic introduction of the recent Volutidae. Hackenheim-Conchbook, 30 pp, 5 pl.

External links
 innaeus, C. (1758). Systema Naturae per regna tria naturae, secundum classes, ordines, genera, species, cum characteribus, differentiis, synonymis, locis. [book]. Editio decima, reformata. Laurentius Salvius: Holmiae, vol. 1, 824 pp
 Mörch O.A.L. (1852-1853). Catalogus conchyliorum quae reliquit D. Alphonso d'Aguirra & Gadea Comes de Yoldi [...]. Fasc. 1, Cephalophora, 170 pp. [1852]; Fasc. 2, Acephala, Annulata, Cirripedia, Echinodermata, 74 [+2] pp. [1853]. Hafniae [Copenhagen]: 
 Gray J.E. (1847). A list of the genera of recent mollusca, their synonyma and types. Proceedings of the Zoological Society of London. 15: 129-219.

Volutidae